Saying Goodbye may refer to:

Saying Goodbye (TV series), a 1990 Canadian drama anthology series
Saying Goodbye, a 2009 short film by Casper Andreas
"Saying Goodbye", a song by Deborah Cox from The Promise, 2008
"Saying Good-Bye", a song by Joe Satriani from Joe Satriani, 1984